Larry B. "Bud" Nornes (born March 21, 1943) is an American politician, businessman, and broadcaster who served as a member of the Minnesota House of Representatives from 1997 to 2021. A member of the Republican Party of Minnesota, he represented District 8A, which includes most of Otter Tail County in west central Minnesota.

Education 
Nornes graduated from Fertile High School in Fertile, then attended Brown Institute of Broadcasting in 1962 for training in communications and broadcasting.

Career 
Nornes has been a broadcaster and radio station owner since 1962. He was a member of the Fergus Falls School Board from 1983 to 1996. He is a member of the Minnesota Broadcaster Association and the National Association of Broadcasters. He is also active in his community as a member of the Fergus Falls Chamber of Commerce, Ducks Unlimited, the Elks, the Kiwanis, Pheasants Forever, and the United Way.

Nornes is the former owner of radio stations KJJK AM and KJJK FM, based in Fergus Falls. He was first elected to the Minnesota House of Representatives in 1996, and was reelected every two years until retiring in 2021. He is a former assistant majority whip.

Personal life 
Nornes's great-grandfather, Ole Opdahl, also served as a Republican member of the Minnesota House, from 1903 to 1907. A farmer in Mansfield Township, Opdahl represented the old District 9, which included Freeborn County.

References

External links 

 Rep. Nornes Web Page
 Minnesota Public Radio Votetracker: Rep. Bud Nornes
 Project Votesmart - Rep. Bud Nornes Profile

1943 births
Living people
People from Fergus Falls, Minnesota
Republican Party members of the Minnesota House of Representatives
American Lutherans
21st-century American politicians
People from Polk County, Minnesota